Anson is an unincorporated community in Sumner County, Kansas, United States.  It is located about 6 miles east of Conway Springs at 1.5 miles south of the intersection of N Anson Rd and W 90th St N, next to an abandoned railroad.

History
A post office was opened in Anson in 1887, and remained in operation until it was discontinued in 1958.

A railroad previously passed through the community, east to west, from Belle Plaine to Conway Springs.

Education
The community is served by Conway Springs USD 356 public school district.

References

Further reading

External links
 Sumner County map, KDOT

Unincorporated communities in Sumner County, Kansas
Unincorporated communities in Kansas